The Complete Directory to Prime Time Network and Cable TV Shows, 1946–Present is a trade paperback reference work by the American television researchers Tim Brooks and Earle Marsh, first published by Ballantine Books in 1979.

History
That first edition won a 1980 U.S. National Book Award in the one-year category General Reference (paperback).
The ninth edition came out in 2007. The title of early editions did not include the words "and cable".

In 2007, co-author Tim Brooks stated that the ninth edition may be the last one released of the book.

Features 

According to the authors, the book is an attempt to list all commercially broadcast network series ever shown in the evening or nighttime hours (defined as 6:00 p.m. Eastern Standard Time or later) in the United States (i.e., prime time and the two hours preceding it). It also lists programs which were widely syndicated in the U.S., and, effective with the sixth edition in 1995, cable television series if, at the time they were aired, the cable network carrying them was available in at least 50% of U.S. homes.

Other criteria for inclusion:

The series must have been carried on a commercial network. Programs produced for and by public broadcasters such as National Educational Television and the Public Broadcasting Service are excluded unless at some point in their existence they had a prime time network or commercial cable television run.
The series must have run for at least four weeks on the same night of the week at the same time, or at least have been planned to do so in the event that it was cancelled prior to this. Thus, specials and miniseries presented on consecutive nights are excluded, with an exception being made for the seminal miniseries Roots and miniseries like North and South, Book II, which was originally presented in a nightly format but then subsequently rerun on a weekly basis.

The 2007 ninth edition also includes individual listings for cable networks themselves.

The book includes other features such as season-by-season schedule charts from 1946 to 2006, list of top thirty Nielsen rated programs from October 1950 to May 2007, list of Emmy Award winners season-by-season, and trivia quiz games. The eighth edition was published in 2003, followed by the ninth edition on 18 October 2007.

Also included is "The Top 100 Series of All Time", an updated ranking of the authors' first-ever ranking of the most popular TV shows from the book TV's Greatest Hits published in 1985, that includes data through the 2006–2007 season. The ranking is based on points for the number of seasons these shows were on and their audience-size ranks for every season. Thus, the series were credited for their popularity and longevity. Some series that were currently on the air had moved up on the list. 60 Minutes, which ranked #9 on the 1985 list, had since risen to #1 by virtue of its continued popularity.

Notes

References

External links 
 History of the book described on Tim Brooks's website

National Book Award-winning works
Television in the United States
1979 non-fiction books
Books about television
Publications established in 1979